WXKR (94.5 FM) is a radio station in Port Clinton, Ohio, broadcasting on 94.5 MHz with a classic rock format.  The station is known as 94.5 XKR, Toledo's Classic Rock.  It is owned by Cumulus Media. The station's studios are located in Toledo, and its transmitter is located west of Oak Harbor, Ohio.

History

WRWR
The station dates back to WRWR, which signed on January 4, 1961, serving the town of Port Clinton.  The station's callsign stood for its founder, Robert W. Reider, a local resident who eventually operated WRWR, WLKR in Norwalk, WAWR in Bowling Green, and WKTN in Kenton through his "Ohio Radio Incorporated" banner. Robert W. Reider operated the station until he died on March 4, 1976, but his company continued operating the station until July 31, 1979, when WRWR, Inc., a subsidiary of Triplett Broadcasting, took over operations.

WOSE/X 94.5
On May 21, 1980, the station's callsign was changed to WOSE (for Ottawa, Sandusky, and Erie counties) with an Adult contemporary format. The station increased its power in 1981, and soon changed format to country music.  However, WOSE eventually changed back to Top 40 hits less than two years later, in 1983. In 1990 it became classic rock and was known as WXKR "X-94.5". The station's transmitting power was boosted and moved closer to Toledo, on Lemoyne Road in Northwood, across the street from Northwood High School.

94.5 K-Rock
In March 1996, after being off the air for a couple of days, the station became "94.5 K-Rock, Rock's New Perspective" in a surprise move to try to compete with WBUZ Buzz 106.5 Toledo. The station focused on an adult alternative format with artists such as Tori Amos, Pete Droge, Rusted Root, Eels, Fastball and Red Hot Chili Peppers, with 1980s retro songs sprinkled in, each introduced as a "Retro Rewind from the X-K-Archives". The station struggled to find a niche in the market, and slowly evolved into somewhat of a mainstream modern rock format, changing its tagline to "Toledo's Modern Rock, 94.5 K-Rock". With continuing low ratings, lack of promotion, and lack of direction, the station changed ownership the next year.

Return to Classic Rock 94.5 XKR
In 1997, Cumulus Broadcasting purchased the station. The station stunted over the last weekend of January 1998 by playing the first five seconds of many classic rock songs followed by the sound effect of a needle dragging across a record. The classic rock format returned the following Monday (February 2, 1998). The station made an immediate return to the top 10 of the Arbitron ratings in Toledo. It was renamed "94.5 XKR" and has retained its format ever since, due to an upswing in the station's ratings and a subsequent drop in WJZE's ratings, which forced WJZE to drop their classic rock format later that summer.

References

External links
WXKR official website
WRWR/Port Clinton Tribute Site

XKR
Classic rock radio stations in the United States
Radio stations established in 1961
Cumulus Media radio stations